HD 16004 is blue-white hued star in the northern constellation of Andromeda. It is a challenge to see with the naked eye even under good viewing conditions, having an apparent visual magnitude of 6.26.

References

B-type giants
Mercury-manganese stars
Andromeda (constellation)
Durchmusterung objects
016004
012057
0746